Chigwell Row is a small village falling within the Epping Forest district of Essex. It is located 12.9 miles (20.8 km) north east of Charing Cross. It has a London (020) area code, is served by London Buses route 150, and the closest London Underground station is Grange Hill.

Notable residents
Prof Edward Philip Harrison FRSE (1877-1948) physicist, meteorologist and military engineer

References

Villages in Essex
Chigwell